"Falling in Love Again (Can't Help It)" is the English language name for a 1930 German song composed by Friedrich Hollaender as "Ich bin von Kopf bis Fuß auf Liebe eingestellt" (literally: "I am, from head to toe, ready for love"). The song was originally performed, in the 1930 film Der Blaue Engel (English translation: The Blue Angel), by Marlene Dietrich, who also recorded the most famous English version, which became her anthem. Dietrich is backed by the Friedrich Hollaender Orchestra.

The English lyrics were written by Sammy Lerner, though they do not include a translation of the original version's most erotic verse; when the English version is sung, the first verse is simply repeated. The song is sometimes co-credited to Reginald Connelly.

Cover versions

The Beatles version
"Falling in Love Again" was covered live by The Beatles in 1962, featuring Paul McCartney on lead vocals, and an alteration to the lyrics. The band had updated the song's melody to a rock-'n'-roll style.
The Beatles' live version can be found on the double LP Live! at the Star-Club in Hamburg, Germany; 1962 (originally released in 1977) and it is the only known available version of the song by the band.

Kevin Ayers version

"Falling in Love Again" was Kevin Ayers’ final release on Island Records. The flip side, "Everyone Knows the Song", was an Ayers original. After the release of this single, Ayers signed to Harvest Records, and both tracks became part of his 1976 album, Yes We Have No Mañanas (So Get Your Mañanas Today). The single was also re-released a few months later by Harvest in parts of Europe but featuring the Ayers original "The Owl" on the B-side.

Track listing
Island release
"Falling in Love Again" (Hollander/Connelly)
"Everyone Knows the Song" (Kevin Ayers)

Harvest release
"Falling in Love Again" (Hollander/Connelly)
"The Owl" (Kevin Ayers)

Personnel
 Kevin Ayers – vocals
 Billy Livsey – keyboards
 Charlie McCracken – bass
 Ollie Halsall – guitar
 Rob Townsend – drums
 Roger Saunders – guitar
 B. J. Cole – steel guitar
 Pip Williams (arr. A-side)

Adicts version

"Falling in Love Again" is a 12-inch single punk band the Adicts, released under the name ADX. It is often included as bonus tracks on reissues of the band's third album, Smart Alex.

Track listing
 "Falling in Love Again"
 "Come Along"
 "It's a Laugh"
 "Saturday Night"

Personnel
 Keith "Monkey" Warren – vocals
 Mel "Spider" Ellis – bass
 Pete "Pete Dee" Davison – guitar
 Michael "Kid Dee" Davison – drums
 John "Scruff" Ellis – guitar
 Dan "Fiddle Dan" Graziani – violin, piano, mandolin

Other versions
The song has also been recorded by the Comedian Harmonists (in German, as "Wir sind von Kopf bis Fuß auf Liebe eingestellt", circa 1930); Zarah Leander (1931, in Swedish); Billie Holiday (1940); Doris Day (1961); Sammy Davis, Jr. (1962); Nina Simone (1966); Claudine Longet (1968); Lill Lindfors (1968, new Swedish lyrics); Denise McCann (1979); Techno Twins (1981); Klaus Nomi (1982); Family Fodder (1983); William S. Burroughs (1990, in German); Ute Lemper, in German and English, on her 1992 Illusions album; Marianne Faithfull (1997); Bryan Ferry (1999); The Puppini Sisters (2006); and Theo Bleckmann (2008). It featured in the Bonzo Dog Doo Dah Band's 40th anniversary tour of 2006; Patricia Kaas (2008, on the album Kabaret); Alain Kan (in English).

Madonna sang a few lines of the song during The Girlie Show Tour in 1993.
It was also sung by Lieutenant Gruber in an episode of the hit sitcom 'Allo 'Allo!.

Linda Ronstadt recorded the song with Nelson Riddle for the album Lush Life (1984).

The song lyrics are parodied in an original Star Trek novel, How Much for Just the Planet? (1987) by John M. Ford.

The Mel Brooks' film Blazing Saddles contains a performance by Madeline Kahn called "I'm Tired", done as a parody of Dietrich's performance in Blue Angel.

Christina Aguilera covered the song for the soundtrack of the motion picture The Spirit, a 2008 American comic book adaptation, written and directed by Frank Miller.

John Prine covered the song with Alison Krauss on his 2016 album 'For Better or For Worse'.

References

1930 songs
1976 singles
Songs with music by Friedrich Hollaender
Songs with lyrics by Sammy Lerner
Nina Simone songs
Kevin Ayers songs
The Adicts songs
Techno Twins songs
Christina Aguilera songs
1985 singles
Sire Records singles
Harvest Records singles
Island Records singles
Song recordings produced by Muff Winwood
Marlene Dietrich songs
Comedian Harmonists songs